Morgan Baker (born 11 May 1997) is an Australian actor best known for playing the role of Callum Jones on the soap opera Neighbours between 2008 and 2014. He briefly reprised the role of Callum in 2015, 2017, 2019 and 2022.

Career

Baker has appeared in TV adverts since he was in kindergarten and has appeared in several tele-movies, films and TV series including The Society Murders, Underbelly and The King. During primary school, he took keyboard lessons.

Baker has said that to succeed in acting, he knows he must focus on it completely and realises he must make some sacrifices, such as quitting his tennis lessons. He also recommends getting an agent and says prospective actors must "get used to being criticised" and that being good at reading helps.

Baker admits that people tell him he is "too quiet on set".
 
A keen chef, Baker has said that if he doesn't succeed in acting he would like to appear on Ready Steady Cook. In light of this, he temporarily produced a cooking series documented on Snapchat titled "Shake and Bake with Morgan Baker", that ran from 2014 to 2015, before experiencing a hiatus and returning in 2016. The theme song was composed by musician Oliver Ryan.

He also starred in the 2006 Tropfest Film Festival top 16 finalist Goggles.

In 2014, Baker left Neighbours to concentrate on his studies. He has since made brief returns in 2015, 2017 and 2019. He reprised it again in 2022 as part of the series finale. 

In July 2018, Baker appeared as a guest competitor on Talkin' 'Bout Your Generation.

References

1997 births
Living people
Male actors from Melbourne
Australian male child actors
21st-century Australian male actors